Maryam Hassouni (born 21 September 1985) is a Dutch television and film actress. In 2006, she won an International Emmy Award for her role in Offers (2005).

Biography
Hassouni's parents, Alia and Abdelbaki Hassouni, are Moroccan and moved to the Netherlands a few years before she was born on 21 September 1985, in Amsterdam. She has a younger brother named Zakariya and a sister called Sarra.

Hassouni received her high school diploma in 2003. She studied museology until 2005, then took law at the Free University in Amsterdam but failed the course.

In 2002, she began her acting career with the role of Dunya El-Beneni in the television series Dunya and Desi, which was nominated for an International Emmy Award for Children and Young People in 2004 and again in 2005.

In 2006, she won the International Emmy Award for Best Performance by an Actress for the role of Laila al Gatawi in the 2005 Dutch TV film Offers.

Selected filmography

Film

Television

Awards
 International Emmy Award for Best Performance by an Actress (2006) in Offers

References

External links
 

1985 births
Dutch film actresses
Dutch television actresses
International Emmy Award for Best Actress winners
Living people
Dutch people of Moroccan descent
Actresses from Amsterdam
21st-century Dutch actresses